is a Japanese surname. People with this surname include:

Torajiro Imada (1859–1940), Japanese police chief and leprosy sanatorium director
Katsuyori Imada (1878–1950), Japanese writer of the Meiji period
Koji Imada (born 1966), Japanese comedian, tarento and TV presenter
Fujio Imada
Masaru Imada (born 1932), Japanese jazz pianist
Jeff Imada (born 1955), American martial artist, stuntman, director, and actor
Ryuji Imada (born 1976), Japanese professional golfer based in the United States
Toby Imada (born 1978), American mixed martial arts fighter

See also
16079 Imada (1999 RP181), main-belt asteroid discovered in 1999
Imada Puppet Troupe, traditional Japanese puppet troupe in the style known as Ningyō Jōruri
 imada (imadat) are divisions of delegations of Tunisia
IMADA, Institute of Mathematics and Computer Science at University of Southern Denmark
IMADA, Inc., a company providing force and torque measurement equipment based in Northbrook, Illinois.

References

Japanese-language surnames